Korczyna may refer to the following places in Poland:

 Korczyna, Lesser Poland Voivodeship
 Korczyna, Podkarpackie Voivodeship
 Gmina Korczyna, Krosno County, Subcarpathian Voivodeship

See also
 Korczyn, Kielce County, Świętokrzyskie Voivodeship